Paulo Innocenti (11 March 1902 – 13 July 1983) was an Italian-Brazilian professional footballer who played as a defender.

Club career
Throughout his club career, Innocenti played for Brazilian club Club Athletico Paulistano, and later played for several Italian clubs, such as Virtus Bologna, Bologna, and Napoli, also serving as the latter side's captain, and winning the league title with Bologna in 1925.

International career
At international level, Innocenti earned 4 caps for the  Italy B side in 1931.

Managerial career
Following his retirement, Innocenti served as manager of Napoli in 1943.

Honours
Bologna
 Divisione Nazionale champion: 1924–25.

References

External links

1902 births
1983 deaths
Brazilian footballers
Italy B international footballers
Italian footballers
Serie A players
Bologna F.C. 1909 players
S.S.C. Napoli players
S.S.C. Napoli managers
Serie A managers
Association football defenders
Brazilian football managers